The Texas–Texas Tech football rivalry is an American college football rivalry between the Texas Longhorns and the Texas Tech Red Raiders. The winner of this gaunlet receives the other universitys' chancellor's sterling silver boot spurs which is what the name of the rivalry is named after. The Battle For The Chancellor's Spurs has been played uninterrupted since the 1960 college football season. After Texas has joined the SEC, the future of this game remains uncertain.

Chancellor's Spurs

The Chancellor's Spurs is the trophy awarded to the winner of the game. The trophy is a set of spurs exchanged between the chancellors of the University of Texas System and Texas Tech University System. The teams first played during the 1928 season and have played annually since 1960 when Texas Tech began participating in the Southwest Conference. The tradition of a "traveling trophy" between the two universities began during the 1996 season when, for the first time, both universities' administration included a chancellor position; the Texas Tech University System was established and the system's first chancellor, John T. Montford, started the exchange of the Chancellor's Spurs between the two universities. The 46th meeting between the teams marked the first game the winner would receive the Chancellor's Spurs. The spurs are gold and silver and engraved with Texas Tech's Double T and Texas' interlocking UT logo.

History
The first meeting took place in 1928, which Texas won 12–0. The Longhorns and Red Raiders only faced each other nine times until 1960. Since 1960, both teams have played annually as members of the Southwest Conference through 1995 and from 1996 as charter members of the Big 12 Conference. The 2008 game was one of three games that led to a 3-way tie controversy in the Big 12 Conference South Division. Texas leads the series 52–17; the Longhorns are 19–7 against the Red Raiders since 1994. Texas Tech's 48–45 victory in 2015 was their first in Austin since 1997. It also ended the Longhorns' six-game winning streak. The Red Raiders' 37-34 victory in overtime on September 24, 2022 is their first victory in Lubbock since 2008.

Game results

See also  
 List of NCAA college football rivalry games

References

College football rivalries in the United States
Texas Longhorns football
Texas Tech Red Raiders football
1928 establishments in Texas